Stanley is a hamlet in Ontario County, New York, United States, located along New York State Route 245 in the Town of Seneca. It has a post office with a zip code of 14561. The Town of Seneca justice court is located in Stanley. Stanley was formerly known as Stanleys Corners; the nearby hamlet of Hall was also formerly known as Halls Corners. Stanley is known by many as the cabbage capital of the Northeastern United States.

References

Hamlets in New York (state)
Hamlets in Ontario County, New York